Eupithecia delicata is a moth in the family Geometridae. It is found in south-western China (Sichuan).

The wingspan is about 20–23 mm. The forewings are light greyish brown and the hindwings are whitish grey with a brownish tinge.

References

Moths described in 2004
delicata
Moths of Asia